ARKA Gallery is an art gallery located at 6 Bolshaya Morskaya Street in the historical center of Saint Petersburg City, Russia. ARKA Gallery specialized in contemporary and modern Russian and foreign painting and fine art legacy of the Leningrad School artists of 1930–1980s.

Location
ARKA Gallery is located between Nevsky Prospekt, the Palace Square and the Hermitage Museum, in the historical building in Eclectic style belonged to banker K. Feleigsen. It was rebuilt by architect Ferdinand Miller in 1879-1880. Many years there was a Hotel d`France, some famous persons lived in it like Russian writers Ivan Turgenev and Alexey Tolstoy. Now one of the oldest exhibition spaces of modern Saint Petersburg has a display area of more than 2,100 square feet (200 m2).

History

ARKA Gallery was established in June 2004 by director and owner Eugenia Logvinova, art historian and curator, a member of International Federation of Artists (IFA), and Art Critics and Art Historians Associations (AIS).

The name of the ARKA was initiated by the nearest neighbourhood with Arch of General Staff Building commemorating the Russian Victory over Napoleon in the Patriotic War of 1812, and also as a sign of special attention to the high traditions of Russian Art. The building was designed by Carlo Rossi in the Empire style and built in 1819-1829. Arch of General Staff also remarkable like an entrance to the Palace Square and new exhibition space of the Hermitage Museum inside the General Staff Building.

Since 2005 ARKA Gallery realized more than 100 exhibit projects mostly in Saint Petersburg, but also in Moscow, Tomsk, Novosybirsk, Barnaul. ARKA Gallery carries out joint projects with the major private collections and state museums of Russia. Also gallery hold some international art projects in Saint Petersburg and showed contemporary art from Italy, China, Japan, Ethiopia, Lithuania, and other countries.

Although the ARKA Gallery emphasized the work of living artists, exhibits were not limited to such works - as evidenced by its showing of Paintings of 1940-1980 by the Artists of the Leningrad School of Painting (February – May, 2013), solo exhibitions by artist Vladimir Sakson (2007), as well as the art of such oldest living masters as theatre artist and painter Muza Oleneva-Degtjareva (2007, 2010, 2011) and graphic artist Valentin Blinov.

Featured Artists

 Nikolai Romanov (b. 1957, Russia)
 Evgeny Zhavoronkov (b. 1948, Russia)
 Ugo Baracco (b. 1949, Italy)
 Taisia Afonina (1913-1994, Russia)
 Nikolai Timkov (1912-1993, Russia)
 Alexander Semionov (1922-1984, Russia)
 Vitaly Tulenev (1937-1998, Russia)
 Vsevolod Bazhenov (1909-1986, Russia)
 Elena Skuin (1908-1986, Russia)
 Vladimir Ovchinnikov (1911-1978, Russia)
 Gevork Kotiantz (1906-1996, Russia)
 Evgenia Antipova (1917-2009, Russia)
 Victor Teterin (1922-1991, Russia)
 Sergei Osipov (1915-1985, Russia)
 Alexei Eriomin (1919-1998, Russia)
 Samuil Nevelshtein (1903-1983, Russia)
 Lev Russov (1926-1987, Russia)
 Nikolai Galakhov (b. 1928, Russia)
 Vladimir Sakson (1927-1988, Russia)
 Evgeny Chuprun (1927-2005, Russia)
 Piotr Alberti (1913-1994, Russia)
 Irina Getmanskaya (b. 1939, Russia)
 Vladimir Chekalov (1922-1992, Russia)
 Sergei Van′kov (Russia)

Editions

 Юлия Вальцефер. Живопись. Спб., «АРКА» арт-галерея, 2012
 Николай Романов. Живопись. Спб., «АРКА» арт-галерея, 2012
 Пасхальный калейдоскоп. Часть 2-я. Спб., «АРКА» арт-галерея, 2010 
 Ugo Baracco. Venezia. Спб., «АРКА» арт-галерея, 2009
 Валентин Блинов. Графика. Спб., «АРКА» арт-галерея, 2008
 Краски Карнавала. Спб., «АРКА» арт-галерея, 2008 
 Николай Романов. Пейзаж. СПб., «АРКА» арт-галерея, 2008
 Старинный Петербург в рисунках Валентина Блинова. Спб., «АРКА» арт-галерея, 2008
 Татьяна Шубина. Железный бестиарий в Петербурге. Спб., «АРКА» арт-галерея, 2008
 Иван Жупан. Живопись, графика. Спб., «АРКА» арт-галерея, 2008 
 Евгений Жаворонков. Живопись. Спб., «АРКА» арт-галерея, 2008 
 Ольга Ардовская. Объекты из металла. Спб., «АРКА» арт-галерея, 2008
 Пасхальный калейдоскоп. Спб., «АРКА» арт-галерея, 2008
 Седьмой ежегодный фестиваль "Японская весна в Санкт-Петербурге" в галерее АРКА. Спб., «АРКА» арт-галерея, 2007
 Игорь Иванов. Реинкарнация металла. СПб., «АРКА» арт-галерея, 2007 
 Владимир Саксон (1927-1988). Живопись. СПб., «АРКА» арт-галерея, 2007 
 Жизнь ангелов. Игорь Шаймарданов. Станислав Маткайтис. СПб., «АРКА» арт-галерея, 2007 
 Александр Филиппов. Санкт-Петербург. Зима. СПб., «АРКА» арт-галерея, 2007 
 Андрей Гонюков. Живопись. СПб., «АРКА» арт-галерея, 2007 
 Уго Баракко. Гравюра. СПб., «АРКА» арт-галерея,  2006 
 Японская эротическая гравюра. СПб., «АРКА» арт-галерея, 2006 
 Олег Гуренков. Живопись. СПб, «АРКА» арт-галерея, 2006 
 Игорь Нелюбович. Живопись. СПб., «АРКА» арт-галерея, 2006 
 Николай Романов. Пейзаж. СПб., 2006

Gallery VIDEO
 Artist Alexander Mikhailovich Semionov (1922-1984)
 Artist Ugo Baracco, Venezian Master
 Artist Nikolai Galakhov. Landscape paintings of 1960-1990s
 Artist Nikolai Pozdneev (1930-1978)
 The City of Leningrad and his citizens in paintings of 1930-1990s. Part 1
 The City of Leningrad and his citizens in paintings of 1930-1990s. Part 2
 Artist Vladimir Ovchinnikov (1911-1978). Masterpieces of landscape paintings
 Crimea in paintings od 1950-1990s. The Leningrad School
 Artist Sergei Ivanovich Osipov (1915-1985). Masterpieces of paintings
 Artist Nikolai Timkov (1912-1993). Masterpieces of landscape paintings
 Still life in Painting of 1930-1990s. The Leningrad School. Part 1
 Still life in Painting of 1930-1990s. The Leningrad School. Part 2
 Still life in Painting of 1930-1990s. The Leningrad School. Part 3
 Artist Nikolai Romanov. Landscape paintings of 1990-2010s
 Spring Motives in Painting of 1950-1990s. The Leningrad School

Services
 Exhibition Space Rent
 Art Consulting
 Framing
 Worldwide Shipping of Art
 Art Editions
 Export-Import Permissions

Sources
 Matthew C. Bown. Dictionary of 20th Century Russian and Soviet Painters 1900-1980s. London, Izomar, 1998.
 Коммерсант, № 134, 24 июля 2004.
 Artindex. Художники`05. Вып.3. T.1. СПб., 2005. С.79-91.
 Янкович К. Из Эфиопии привезли «маскалей» // Смена, 2005, 16 декабря. 
 Лисовец М. Осколки чужих небес на фоне белой ночи // Невское время, 2005, 20 мая.
 «Арка» продолжает радовать // Новости Петербурга, 2005, № 24 (400).
 Логвинова Е. Муза и деньги // Free Time, 2006, №1 (92), C.30.
 Логвинова Е. Прогулки по Большой Морской. Азибо – осколки целого мира // Новости Петербурга, 2006, №49 (476). 
 Дружинина Е. Берёза сама меня выбрала // Шанс, 2007, № 30, 9 марта.
 Петрова Л. Лопух как символ революции // Невское время, 2007, 15 марта. 
 Sergei V. Ivanov. Unknown Socialist Realism. The Leningrad School. Saint Petersburg, NP-Print Edition, 2007. 
 Второй Московский международный фестиваль искусств «Традиции и современность». М., 2008. С.154-155.
 Российская газета, 5 июня 2008.
 Северная Пальмира глазами художников // Вечерний Новосибирск, 2008, 28 марта.
 Вечтомова С. В Питере к Пасхе расписали страусиные яйца! // Смена, 2008, 28 апреля.
 Ветров И. Очевидный Петербург // Российская газета, 2008, 30 мая. 
 Токмаков В. Белые ночи в Барнауле // Российская газета, 2008, 5 июня. 
 Михайлов В. Лайт Металл // Санкт-Петербургские Ведомости, 2009, 7 августа.
 Чердакова Д. Тайна пляшущих человечков // На Невском, 2010, № 6 (161).

References

External links 

 ARKA Gallery Official Site
 ARKA Gallery at the Museums of Russia Portal
 ARKA Gallery presents the exhibition "Magic Nude" at Novosybirsk State Museum
 ARKA Gallery presents the exhibition "Magic Nude" at Barnaul State Art Museum

Contemporary art galleries in Russia
2004 establishments in Russia
Art galleries in Saint Petersburg
Art galleries established in 2004
Art museums and galleries in Saint Petersburg